Enver İzmaylov born (June 12, 1955) is a Crimean Tatar folk and jazz guitarist who uses a tapping style on electric guitar.

Career
Enver İzmaylov was born in Fergana, Uzbek Soviet Socialist Republic, Soviet Union into a Crimean Tatar family previously deported from  the Crimea  in which he later returned to 1989. 

Although he played guitar since he was fifteen, he studied bassoon at the Fergana Music School and graduated in 1973. For eight years he was a member of the band Sato and appeared on the albums Efsane (1986) and Give Your Love for a Friend in a Circle in (1987). He went back to school and got a degree from Tashkert University, then began a solo career.

In 1995 he won the First European International Guitar Competition in Lausanne, Switzerland. During the same year, he was named Musician of the Year by Ukrainian music critics. He has toured in Ukraine, Russia, Estonia, Moldavia, Bulgaria, Finland, Norway, Sweden, Denmark, Belgium, Italy, Germany, Turkey, and the U.S.

In addition to recording solo albums, he has worked in duets with French keyboardist Xavier Garcia, Turkish drummer Burhan Ocal, and British saxophonist Geoff Warren. He founded the Art Trio of Crimea with Bari Rustem on percussion and Narket Ramazanov on clarinet, saxophone, and flute. İzmaylov is also a throatsinger.

Technique
İzmaylov plays guitar by tapping the neck of the electric guitar with his fingertips as if it were a keyboard. A similar technique is used by jazz guitarist Stanley Jordan.

İzmaylov combines Crimean Tatar traditional music, Turkish, Uzbek, Balkan, classical music, and jazz. Many of his pieces are composed in time signatures such as 5/8, 7/8, 9/8, 11/8, 11/16, and 13/16 which are common in Crimean Tatar music. He has a triple-neck guitar that was custom made for him in Kyiv. He uses two nonstandard tunings: (low to high) E, B, E, E, B, E and C, C, G, C, C, C.

Family
Enver's daughter Leniye İzmaylova is a popular singer among Crimean Tatars. She combines folk, jazz, and pop music in her repertoire.

Discography
 At a Ferghana Bazaar (Tutu, 1993)
 Art of the Duo with Geoff Warren (Tutu, 1996)
 The Eastern Legend (Boheme, 1998)
 Minaret (Boheme, 1999)

References

External links 
 Official web site
 Enver Izmailov: A Guitar From The East That Conquered The West (interview with Olga Potekhina)

Living people
1955 births
People from Fergana
Crimean Tatar musicians
Ukrainian folk guitarists
Ukrainian jazz guitarists
Uzbekistani emigrants to Ukraine
Recipients of the title of Merited Artist of Ukraine